The Italdesign Giugiaro Gea is a full-size luxury concept car designed and produced by Italian auto design house Italdesign Giugiaro. It was introduced in 2015 at the Geneva Motor Show.

Features 
Among many of its innovative features are headlights that change with driving mode. In normal mode they are white, but when autonomous mode is selected, they turn blue. Its 26-inch wheels are crafted out of single blocks of aluminium. Aluminium, carbon fibre and magnesium are used to keep the weight down to 2,000 kg (4,409 lb). In autonomous mode, there are three settings for passenger comfort. Business, for people who need to get work done on the go, includes the dash turning white (which studies have proven to increase productivity), a pair of 19-inch touchscreens dropping down in front of the rear seats and the front passenger seat either turning around to face those in the rear or folding down to make a table. In Wellness mode, designed for people who want to do exercises on longer journeys, the ambient lighting turns amber and two platforms each on the top and the bottom of the seats come out allowing isometric upper body and lower body exercise to take place. In Dream mode, the ambient lighting turns blue, pictures of stars and galaxies are broadcast across the roof, the driver's side passenger's seat gets footrests and the two other seats join together to make a bed. The interior includes materials such as woven parchment leather, painted lacquer and unstained silk carpets. It uses a similar side-mirror video camera system to the Giugiaro Brivido.

Performance 
The Gea is powered by four 142 kW (190.4 hp) electric motors for a total of 570 kw (764.4 hp). Italdesign says it has a top speed of 250 km/h (155 mph).

References

Giugiaro Gea
Electric concept cars